The White Eagles, also known as the Avengers,  were a Serbian paramilitary group associated with the Serbian National Renewal (SNO) and the Serbian Radical Party (SRS). The White Eagles fought in Croatia and Bosnia and Herzegovina during the Yugoslav Wars.

In the 2003 ICTY Vojislav Šešelj indictment, the group is included as an alleged party in the joint criminal enterprise, in which Vojislav Šešelj allegedly took part. In the indictment the group is identified as "volunteer units including 'Chetnik', or Šešeljevci (translated into English as 'Šešelj's men')". This association has been denied by SRS leader Vojislav Šešelj.

Name
Although the group's members were occasionally referred to as Chetniks, they are not to be confused with the Serbian anti fascist and anti communist guerrilla group during and after World War II also known as the White Eagles and also referred to as Chetniks. The name White Eagles comes from an anti-communist organisation that was formed during World War II and continued a guerrilla war against Tito's government after the war.  White Eagle refers to the national symbol of Serbia, the double headed white eagle under a crown.

History
The White Eagles paramilitary group was formed in late 1990 by Dragoslav Bokan and Mirko Jović. The group split into different fractions as Bokan and Jović went their separate ways in 1992. Jović called for "a Christian, Orthodox Serbia with no Muslims and no unbelievers".
Šešelj states that the group was started by Jović but they got out of his control. According to Šešelj, the White Eagles and Arkan's Tigers operated with help from the Yugoslav counterintelligence service.

War crimes

Testimony at the International War Crimes Tribunal indicates that the White Eagles were responsible for a number of atrocities during the Croatian and Bosnian wars, including: the Voćin massacre, Višegrad massacre, crimes at Foča, Gacko and others. Various members of the White Eagles were indicted by the Tribunal. Mitar Vasiljević received a fifteen-year sentence. Former head, Milan Lukić, received a life sentence for his war crimes which include murdering men, women and children.

It has been also reported that White Eagles managed a detention camp in Liješće, near Bosanski Brod.

Reappearance 
In December 2010 a group called "White Eagles" took responsibility for the killing of Kosovo's Bosniak leader Šefko Salković in the north of Kosovo. The group also took responsibility for obstructions of the election process in northern Kosovska Mitrovica, as well as for attacking KFOR troops.

References

External links
 "White Eagles - Serbian Radical Party (SRS)" Federation of American Scientists, 1998
 (22 November 1993) Vreme News Digest Agency No 113

Paramilitary organizations in the Yugoslav Wars
Military units and formations of the Croatian War of Independence
Chetniks
Military units and formations of the Bosnian War
Far-right politics
Military wings of political parties
Paramilitary organizations based in Serbia
1991 establishments in Serbia
Military units and formations established in 1991
Military units and formations disestablished in 1995
Anti-communist organizations